Wild Dreams of New Beginnings is the third album by the Belgian rock band Admiral Freebee. It was released on 10 October 2006 by Universal Music Belgium.

The album was produced by Malcolm Burn and includes a duet with Emmylou Harris ("Coming of the Knight").

Track listing
"Faithful to the Night" – 3:06
"I'd Much Rather Go Out with the Boys" – 3:14
"Trying To Get Away" – 3:46
"All Through the Night" – 2:42
"Perfect Town" – 4:52
"Nobody Knows You" – 3:56
"Wild Dreams of New Beginnings" – 3:23
"Devil in the Details" – 3:16
"Living for the Weekend" – 2:58
"Blue Eyes" – 2:25
"Coming of the Knight" – 3:44

Charts

Weekly charts

Year-end charts

References

External links

Admiral Freebee albums
2006 albums
Albums produced by Malcolm Burn